Orders, decorations, and medals of Argentina include:

Orders
 Order of the Liberator General San Martín
 Order of May
Distinguished Service Order
 Order of Naval Merit
 Order of Aeronautical Merit
Decorations and medals
 Cross to the Heroic Valour in Combat 
 Medal of Valour in Combat
Medal for the Malvinas Campaign 1982
Killed in Combat Medal
Wounded in Combat Medal
Army Military Merit Medal
 Army Effort and Abnegation Medal
Army Wounded in Combat Medal
Malvinas Campaign Medal of Gratitude

External links

 
Argentina